The 2022  Estoril Open was a men's tennis tournament played on outdoor clay courts. It was the 7th edition of the tournament and part of the ATP Tour 250 series of the 2022 ATP Tour. It took place at the Clube de Ténis do Estoril in Cascais, Portugal, from 25 April through 1 May 2022.

Champions

Singles

  Sebastián Báez def.  Frances Tiafoe, 6–3, 6–2

Doubles

  Nuno Borges /  Francisco Cabral def.  Máximo González /  André Göransson, 6–2, 6–3

Points and prize money

Point distribution

Prize money 

*per team

Singles main draw entrants

Seeds

1 Rankings are as of 18 April 2022

Other entrants
The following players received wildcards into the main draw:
  Nuno Borges
  João Sousa
  Dominic Thiem

The following players received entry from the qualifying draw:
  Pablo Cuevas
  Hugo Dellien 
  Pierre-Hugues Herbert
  Bernabé Zapata Miralles

The following players received entry as lucky losers:
  Carlos Taberner
  Fernando Verdasco

Withdrawals 
 Before the tournament
  Pablo Carreño Busta → replaced by  Richard Gasquet
  Laslo Đere → replaced by  Pablo Andújar
  Pedro Martínez → replaced by  Jiří Veselý
  Cameron Norrie → replaced by  Carlos Taberner
  Arthur Rinderknech → replaced by  Sebastián Báez
  Diego Schwartzman → replaced by  Fernando Verdasco

Doubles main draw entrants

Seeds

 Rankings are as of 18 April 2022

Other entrants
The following pairs received wildcards into the doubles main draw:
  Nuno Borges /  Francisco Cabral
  Pablo Cuevas /  João Sousa

Withdrawals
Before the tournament
  Marcelo Arévalo /  Jean-Julien Rojer → replaced by  Jonny O'Mara /  Ken Skupski
  Federico Coria /  Pedro Martínez → replaced by  Federico Coria /  Benoît Paire
  Máximo González /  Marcelo Melo → replaced by  Máximo González /  André Göransson 
  Andrés Molteni /  Andrea Vavassori → replaced by  Nathaniel Lammons /  Tommy Paul
  Jamie Murray /  Édouard Roger-Vasselin → replaced by  Jamie Murray /  Michael Venus

References

External links
 Official website

 
Estoril Open
Estoril Open
2022
Estoril Open
Estoril Open